2010 in esports

Calendar of events

 
Esports by year